Tim Knopp is an American Republican politician from Oregon. He is a member of the Oregon State Senate and has been the senate minority leader since 2021. He previously served as a member of the Oregon House of Representatives from 1999 to 2005.

Early life and education
Knopp attended York Community High School.

Political career

Oregon House
Knopp served three terms in the Oregon House of Representatives. He was first elected in 1998 and left the House in 2005. Knopp was majority leader in 2003. While in the House, Knopp was strongly opposed to abortion and allied to social conservatives. In 1999, Knopp helped enshrine Oregon's unique "kicker" law, which returns excess tax revenue back to taxpayers, into the Constitution by sponsoring referral legislation that brought Measure 86 to the voters in 2000. Measure 86 was approved by a 62% of voters.

Oregon Senate
Knopp was first elected to the Oregon Senate in 2012. At the time, Knopp was executive vice president of the Central Oregon Home Builders and a past president of the Deschutes County Republican Central Committee. He defeated incumbent Senator Chris Telfer in the Republican primary, winning 38% of the primary vote to Telfer's 32%. Knopp then defeated Democratic nominee Geri Hauser in the general election. In 2014, Knopp was named deputy caucus leader of the Oregon Senate Republicans.

Knopp won reelection in 2016 with 60.9% of the vote, defeating Democratic nominee Greg Delgado.

Employment and pension legislation
Knopp voted for the Oregon Equal Pay Act, which unanimously passed the Senate in 2017. In 2019, Knopp, along with Democratic senator Sara Gelser, introduced two bills on workplace sexual harassment, The pieces of legislation, both signed into law by Governor Kate Brown, prohibited Oregon employers from requiring, as a condition of employment, nondisclosure agreements blocking employees from discussing allegations of employment discrimination or sexual assault, and requiring public employers to have written anti-harassment policies and procedures.

Knopp introduced many bills to overhaul Oregon's pension system for public employees (Oregon PERS), by moving it from a defined benefit program to a 401(k)-style defined contribution plan.

Climate change and 2019 walkout
Knopp rejects the scientific consensus on climate change. Knopp opposed legislation to increase the production of renewable energy and limit greenhouse gas emissions.

Knopp opposed the 2019 cap and trade bill. In 2019, Knopp and the other 11 state Senate Republicans walked out of the state Senate session, seeking to block the Democratic majority in the Senate from passing cap and trade legislation to combat climate change by lowering greenhouse gas emissions. Most of the Republicans fled to Idaho, and the absence deprived the chamber of a quorum.  Republicans insisted that the bill would increase fuel prices and hurt the economy. In an interview with The Oregonian Knopp said, "I feel no constitutional obligation to stand around so they can pass their leftist progressive agenda ... I think that’s true for every other Senate district that's out there that's represented by Republicans." At the time, there were 29 senators (the Senate has 30 seats, but 1 was vacant due to a death). Without the Republican senators, the remaining 18 Democratic state senators could not reach a quorum of 20 to hold a vote. Knopp said that he had left Oregon "in a cabin near a lake .... And that's about all I can tell you."
Knopp was the only Republican senator who did not take part in the 2020 walk-out by both the Senate and the House over a cap-and-trade bill.
The Republican caucus chose Knopp as minority leader for the 2021 session.

Anti-vaccination activities
Knopp was a leading opponent of legislation in 2015 and 2019 to eliminate non-medical exemptions to the requirement that Oregon schoolchildren be vaccinated. Speaking at an anti-mandatory vaccination rally in 2019, Knopp said passage of the legislation would lead to "no freedom in America."

January 6 attack on the Capitol
In January 2021, after a pro-Trump mob violently stormed the U.S. Capitol in Washington, D.C., the Oregon Republican Party passed a resolution falsely claiming that the attack was a staged "false flag" attack. Knopp issued a statement disavowing the falsehood, as did all 23 state House Republicans.

Personal life
Knopp is married to his wife, Melissa and has four children. During the 2017 legislative session, Knopp employed his wife and son Daniel as paid legislative staff.

References

1965 births
21st-century American politicians
Living people
Republican Party members of the Oregon House of Representatives
Republican Party Oregon state senators
Politicians from Bend, Oregon